People:
 Helianti Hilman, Indonesian lawyer
 Oscar Hilman (born 1950), U.S. Army bigadier general
 Hilman Walker (October 10, 1912 – May 1983) was an American football player and coach.

See also 
 Hillman (disambiguation)